Mwasiti Almas Yusuph (born February 2, 1986) popularly known as Mwasiti, is a singer and songwriter of Afropop, Zouk and Bongo Flava music from Tanzania. She is best known for her single "Nalivua Pendo," which was number one on the Tanzania radio charts for eight consecutive weeks and won "Best Zouk Song" at the 2009 Tanzania Music Awards.

Early life and career 
Mwasiti started her music career in 2006 after joining Tanzania House of Talent. She released her first single titled Nambie in 2006, which was nominated twice at the Tanzania Music Awards as Best newcomer artist and nominated for Best zouk song. In 2014 she performed in New York City at the Malaria No More Benefit Concert, organized by Malaria No More.

In year 2006, she was nominated ‘Best Upcoming Female Artist’ at the Tanzania Music awards. Her single "Nalivua Pendo" holds the record for staying number one on the radio charts for eight consecutive weeks, and stayed on the charts for the next 30 weeks. It then won "Best Zouk Song" at the 2009 Tanzania Music Awards. At the 2013 Tanzania Music Awards, Mwasiti become the first female artist to receive five nominations. She has said her songs have been inspired by aspects of her own life. She believes it's important for Tanzanian artists to remember their roots. She is a civil rights activist for causes such as malaria and helping refugees.

Discography

Albums

Singles 
 Nambie (2006)
 Hao (featuring Chidi Benz) (2007)
 Nalivua pendo (2008)
 Sio kisa pombe (2009)
 Serebuka (2010)
 Sema nae (2012)
 Unaniangalia (2013)
 Kaa nao (2016)
 Mapenzi ugonjwa (2017)

Awards and nominations

References

1986 births
Living people
21st-century Tanzanian women singers
People from Dar es Salaam
 Tanzanian Bongo Flava musicians
 Swahili-language singers